Opostega kuznetzovi is a moth of the family Opostegidae. It was described by Kozlov in 1985. It is known from the Russian Far East.

Adults have been recorded in July.

References

Opostegidae
Moths described in 1985